The 1990 Dushanbe riots were an anti-government unrest in Dushanbe, the capital of Tajikistan, from February 12–14, 1990.

Riots
In 1988, in the aftermath of the Sumgait pogrom and anti-Armenian riots in Azerbaijan, 39 Armenian refugees from Azerbaijan were temporarily resettled in Dushanbe. In 1990, the Armenian influx became a subject of the rumour that triggered riots in Dushanbe. The rumour inflated the number of refugees to 2,500–5,000. According to rumour Armenians allegedly were being resettled in new housing in Dushanbe, which was experiencing an acute housing shortage at that time. Despite the fact that Armenian refugees resettled not in public housing but with their relatives, and by 1990 had already left Tajikistan for Armenia, official denouncement of the rumours was not able to stop the protests. Assurances by First Secretary of the Communist Party of Tajikistan Qahhor Mahkamov that no resettlement of Armenians were taking place were rejected by the demonstrators.

Soon, demonstrations sponsored by the nationalist Rastokhez movement turned violent. Radical economical and political reforms were demanded by the protesters. Government buildings, shops and other businesses were attacked and looted. Armenians, Russians, and other ethnic minorities were targeted. Abuse of Tajik women wearing European clothes in public also took place. The riots were put down by Soviet troops called into Dushanbe by Mahkamov. However Mahkamov's over-reliance on military force was criticized by Buri Karimov, a deputy chair of Council of Ministers, who called for the resignation of the leadership of the Tajik Communist Party. On February 14, 1990 Mahkamov and Prime Minister of Tajikistan Izatullo Khayoyev submitted their resignations, but they were not accepted by the Central Committee of the Tajik Communist Party.

During the Dushanbe riots, a period lasting a couple of days, 26 people were killed and 565 were injured. Among the Tajik youth activists convicted for participation in the riots was a future minister of the interior of Tajikistan Yaqub Salimov.
Smaller scale anti-Armenian incidents were also recorded in neighboring Turkmenistan.

Aftermath

Tajikistan would declare independence on 9 December 1991, from the collapsing Soviet Union. In 1992, a civil war would begin in the newly independent nation.

References

1990 riots
Mass murder in 1990
1990 in Tajikistan
Ethnic riots
Anti-Armenian pogroms
Riots and civil disorder in the Soviet Union
Protests in the Soviet Union
20th century in Dushanbe
February 1990 events in Asia
1990 protests